The Koster Waltz (Swedish: Kostervalsen) is a 1958 Swedish romance film directed by Rolf Husberg and starring Egon Larsson, Åke Söderblom, Yvonne Lombard and Gaby Stenberg. It was shot at the Centrumateljéerna Studios in Stockholm. The film's sets were designed by the art director Nils Nilsson.

Cast
 Egon Larsson as 	Kurt Granberg
 Åke Söderblom as Pelle Boman
 Yvonne Lombard as 	Maja Boman
 Gaby Stenberg as 	Birgit Anderberg
 Isa Quensel as 	Doris Fågelström
 Tilly Stephan as 	Mitzi Lachenberg
 Sven Lindberg as 	Bertram Johansson
 Einar Fagstad as 	Svalan Söderman
 Lars Egge as 	Konrad Anderberg
 Sangrid Nerf as Solveig
 Marie Ahlstedt as 	Elev på ferieskolan 
 Jessie Flaws as 	Ann
 Birgitta Ander as 	Chris
 Gunilla Asp as Elev på ferieskolan 
 Bernt Callenbo as 	Journalist 
 Lars-Owe Carlberg as 	Polis 
 Ulla Edin as 	Modell på reklambyrån 
 Lilian Elgö as 	Flicka på reklambyrån 
 Janne Eriksson as 	Pojken på reklambyrån 
 Lauritz Falk as 	Henrik Åman 
 Berit Frodi as 	Fru Nilsson, hembiträde 
 Lennart Hellsing as 	Gäst på direktör Anderbergs båt 
 Marita Holm as 	Elev på ferieskolan 
 Vincent Jonasson as 	Detektiv i Fjällbackas hamn 
 Ann Karlén as 	Camilla 
 Berit Kullander as 	Elev på ferieskolan 
 Torsten Lilliecrona as 	Reklambyrådirektör 
 Sune Mangs as 	Fotograf 
 Richard Mattsson as 	Advokat 
 Lisbeth Redner as 	Elev på ferieskolan 
 Hanny Schedin as 	Andersson
 Sune Waldimir as 	Kapellmästaren 
 Inga-Lill Åhström as 	Hilda

References

Bibliography 
 Krawc, Alfred. International Directory of Cinematographers, Set- and Costume Designers in Film: Denmark, Finland, Norway, Sweden (from the beginnings to 1984). Saur, 1986.
 Qvist, Per Olov & von Bagh, Peter. Guide to the Cinema of Sweden and Finland. Greenwood Publishing Group, 2000.

External links 
 

1958 films
Swedish romance films
1950s romance films
1950s Swedish-language films
Films directed by Rolf Husberg
Films set in Stockholm
1950s Swedish films

sv:Kostervalsen (film)